The 2011–12 Gibraltar Premier Division was the 113th season of the national football league in Gibraltar since its establishment - the highest level of football in Gibraltar. It was contested by six clubs - all of which are amateur. The season began on 8 October 2011 and ended on 31 March 2012. Lincoln Red Imps were the defending champions, and successfully defended their title.

Participating teams
 Glacis United
 Lincoln
 Lions Gibraltar
 SJ Athletic Corinthians
 St Joseph's
 Manchester United

League table

Results 
Each team played every other team four times, for a total of 20 matches.

Matches 1–10

Matches 11–20

References

External links
Season at RSSSF

Gibraltar Premier Division seasons
Gib
1